Pseudoalteromonas ulvae is a marine bacterium isolated from the alga Ulva lactuca at the intertidal zone near Sydney.

References

External links
Type strain of Pseudoalteromonas ulvae at BacDive -  the Bacterial Diversity Metadatabase

Alteromonadales
Bacteria described in 2001